Ghost of the China Sea is a 1958 American war film released by Columbia Pictures co-written by Charles B. Griffith set during World War II.  It was the last movie directed by Fred F. Sears.

Plot
During World War II, Japanese troops over-run a sugar cane plantation in the Philippines. Some survivors take over a small boat called the USS Frankenstein and attempt to sail to safety.

Cast
David Brian as Martin French
Lynn Bernay as Justine Woolf
Jonathan Haze as Larry Peters
Norman Wright as Darby Edwards
Harry Chang as Hito Matsumo
Gene Bergman as Sabatio Trinidad
Kam Fong Chun as Pvt. Hakashima
Mel Prestidge as Gaetano Gato
Jamie Del Rosario
Dan Taba as Capt. Zaikaku
Bud Pente as Col. McCutcheon

Production
Following his success with Corman, Columbia Pictures signed Griffith to a contract as producer and director. The film was the first of what was meant to be five movies made by Griffith for Columbia Pictures, but he ended up only making two - this and Forbidden Island. Both were shot on location in Hawaii. Jonathan Haze later recalled:
Chuck had a friend who was a lawyer, Art Sherman, who had met Gordon Stolberg, then vice-president of Columbia Pictures. Art sold Stolberg on the  idea that Chuck was the talent behind Roger Corman. At that point, Columbia was making a lot of Sam Katzman movies and Art sold Columbia on the idea that Chuck could do better than Katzman, and cheaper. So, they gave him a two-picture deal.Had he come through and he had really done what he said he was going to do. Chuck would have had it really made. Both pictures ran over-budget and were not that hot. His casting was bad.
According to Charles Griffith, "They told me to make a list of 100 titles to see if I could do it. Once I did that, they picked out two that would send me on a distant location in Hawaii because they knew I couldn't make a picture out of the promised budgets: $85,000/black and white and $90,000/color."

The two films were meant to cost $150,000. Forbidden Island was meant to be filmed in ten days, starting 4 November 1957, but Griffith went over schedule. According to Variety "Columbia noted that Griffith seemed to be having continuing production difficulties" and sent out one of its contract directors, Fred Sears, to direct the second movie, Ghost of the China Sea.

References

External links

Ghost of the China Sea at TCMDB
Ghost of the China Sea at New York Times
Review of film at Variety

1950s English-language films
Films set in the Philippines
Films with screenplays by Charles B. Griffith
Columbia Pictures films
1950s war films
American war films
Films directed by Fred F. Sears
1950s American films